"You Weren't in Love with Me" is a song by Australian singer-songwriter Billy Field. It was released in July 1981 as the second and final single from his debut studio album, Bad Habits. The song peaked at number one on the Australian Kent Music Report and entered the top 30 in New Zealand. At the APRA Music Awards of 1982, the song won Most Performed Australasian Popular Work.

Track listings
Australian 7-inch single
A. "You Weren't in Love with Me" – 3:24
B. "Celebrity Lane" – 2:41

UK 7-inch single
A. "You Weren't in Love with Me" – 3:24
B. "Baby I'm Easy" – 2:16

Charts

Weekly charts

Year-end charts

See also
 List of number-one singles in Australia during the 1980s
 List of top 25 singles for 1981 in Australia

References

APRA Award winners
1981 songs
1981 singles
Number-one singles in Australia
Warner Music Group singles